Touchdown is a 1931 American pre-Code football film directed by Norman Z. McLeod and starring Richard Arlen, Peggy Shannon, Jack Oakie and Regis Toomey. Jim Thorpe and Herman Brix appear uncredited as  unbilled football players.

Plot
Football coach Dan Curtis (Richard Arlen) has to decide how much he wants to win, when one of his players is injured, when he puts in him the game to play, while still recovering from a previous injury.

Veteran coach "Pop" Stewart (J. Farrell MacDonald) warns him that winning at all costs isn't worth it; and, he could lose a lot more than a game, including the respect of his old friend Babe (Jack Oakie); his girl, Mary (Peggy Shannon); and, his player, Paul (Charles Starrett) could lose his life.

Cast
 Richard Arlen as Dan Curtis
 Peggy Shannon as Mary Gehring
 Jack Oakie as Babe Barton
Regis Toomey as Tom Hussey
 George Barbier as Jerome Gehring
 J. Farrell MacDonald as Pop Stewart
 George Irving as President Baker

Related information
Herman Brix broke his shoulder during filming, Touchdown; and,  was unable to play Tarzan, in MGM's screen adaptation of Edgar Rice Burroughs's popular character, in the 1932 film, Tarzan the Ape Man. The injury prevented him from competing in the 1932 Olympics. At the time, he still held the world record for shot put. Swimming champion Johnny Weissmuller replaced him, as Tarzan, and became a major star.

See also
 List of American football films

References

External links
 Touchdown in the Internet Movie Database

1931 films
American football films
Films directed by Norman Z. McLeod
1930s sports films
American black-and-white films
1930s American films